The Kansas State Wildcats men's basketball team represents Kansas State University in college basketball competition. The program is classified in the NCAA Division I, and is a member of the Big 12 Conference. The head coach is Jerome Tang. 

The program began competition in 1902. The first two major-conference titles won by the school were won by the men's basketball team, in 1917 and 1919 (in the Missouri Valley Intercollegiate Athletic Association). Kansas State has gone on to win 19 regular season conference crowns. Jeff Sagarin listed the program 27th in his all-time rankings in the ESPN College Basketball Encyclopedia. Following the 2021–22 season, the Wildcats have a record of 1,691–1,212.

History
Kansas State University has appeared in 31 NCAA basketball tournaments, most recently in 2019. The team's all-time record in the NCAA tournament is 37–35. Kansas State's best finish at the tournament came in 1951, when it lost to Kentucky in the national championship game. The school has reached the Final Four 4 times, the Elite Eight 13 times, and the Sweet Sixteen 17 times.  Included among K-State's tournament wins are some all-time classics, including an 83–80 win over Oscar Robertson's Cincinnati team in 1958, which Sports Illustrated called "the most exciting game of the 1958 season," and a 50–48 win over second-ranked Oregon State in 1981, which USA Today listed as one of the greatest games in NCAA tournament history.

The team also had some notably successful seasons before the creation of the NIT (1938) and the NCAA tournament (1939), including conference titles in 1917 and 1919 under coach Zora G. Clevenger.  The Helms Athletic Foundation named Frank Reynolds the program's first All-American player in 1917, and the Premo-Porretta Power Poll retroactively ranked Kansas State #12 in 1910, #18 in 1916, #8 in 1917 and #7 in 1919.

The best season in the school's history may have been 1959, when the team finished the season ranked #1 in the final Associated Press Poll and Coaches Poll. K-State has finished ranked in the Top 10 of one of the two polls on ten occasions (most recently in 2010), and in the final top 25 polls 21 total times. The team has also posted a winning record at home every year since 1946.

After a lengthy period with little success during the 1990s and 2000s, the team returned to prominence under head coach Frank Martin. Following a twelve-year absence, the team returned to the NCAA tournament after the 2007–08 season.  Following that season, Kansas State freshman Michael Beasley was named an All-American and Big 12 Conference Player of the Year. In the 2009–10 season, the team spent much of the year ranked in the Top 10 of the AP Poll and finished second in the Big 12. The team received a #2 seed in the 2010 NCAA Division I men's basketball tournament and advanced to the Elite Eight. Along the way, the Wildcats defeated Xavier in a double-overtime thriller, which CBSSports.com called "one of the best games in the history of the Sweet 16."

On March 31, 2012, Bruce Weber was announced as head coach after Frank Martin left for South Carolina. During the 2012–2013 season, Weber's first in Manhattan, Kansas State won its first regular season conference title since 1977 and advanced to the NCAA tournament. Weber's team won the conference title again in the 2018–2019 season. K-State appeared in the NCAA tournament five times in Weber's seven seasons, including advancing to the Elite Eight in 2018.

Kansas State has a total of 36 All-Americans, 19 regular-season conference championships and nine conference tournament championships.

The program ranks in the top 25 nationally in the following categories:

The program also ranks in the top 40 nationally in the following categories:

Top 25 rankings 
Kansas State University has finished in the final rankings of the AP Poll or Coaches Poll on 21 occasions throughout its history, including one season at #1 in the final polls (pre-NCAA Tournament). The AP Poll first appeared in 1948, and has been published continuously since 1950–51. The Coaches Poll began in the 1950–51 season. Currently, the final AP Poll is released before the tournament and the final Coaches Poll is released after the tournament.

Rivalries

Kansas: Sunflower Showdown

Kansas State's main rivalry is with the Kansas Jayhawks. The rivalry peaked in the 1950s when both teams were annually national title contenders. The 1987–88 season also proved to be momentous in the rivalry. In the first matchup of the season, on January 30, 1988, Mitch Richmond scored 35 points to lead Kansas State to a 72–61 win to halt KU's then-record 55-game home winning streak. On February 18, KU turned the tables, prevailing 64–63 at Ahearn Field House in Manhattan to deny K-State a victory over KU in the old field house's last year. In what was supposed to be the rubber game, in the 1988 Big Eight Conference men's basketball tournament, Kansas State won a decisive victory by a 69–54 score. However, the biggest was yet to come. Both teams qualified for the NCAA tournament, and after three wins each in the tournament they faced each other on March 27 in Pontiac, Michigan, for the right to advance to the Final Four. Led by Danny Manning's 20 points, KU turned a tight game into a runaway and prevailed 71–58. Kansas would go on to win the national championship.

The rivalry slipped in significance after the 1988 season, and from 1994 to 2005 KU won 31 straight games against K-State, the longest streak for either school in the series.  KU also posted a 24-game win streak against the Wildcats in Manhattan, which ended on January 30, 2008, when #22 Kansas State upset #2 Kansas 84–75.

Jeff Sagarin's rankings of the nation's top programs by decade in the ESPN College Basketball Encyclopedia nicely track the history of the rivalry. In the 1950s, when the rivalry was at its peak, Kansas State finished the decade ranked as the #3 program in the nation and KU was ranked as #4. In the 1960s KU was ranked #9 for the decade and KSU was ranked #11. In the 1970s, the programs were again nearly even, with Kansas State ranked at #24 and KU at #25. In the 1980s some separation appeared, as KU finished the decade ranked at #19 and Kansas State at #31. The big difference appeared in the 1990s and 2000s when KU was ranked at #4 and #2 for the decades, while Kansas State does not appear anywhere in the top 40.

The rivalry has become more relevant again in recent years, with both teams ranked in the AP Top 25 for many of their match-ups.

Missouri
As of the 2014–15 season, Missouri is Kansas State's second most-played rival, with 235 games dating back to 1907. Kansas State leads the series 119–116. The series was last played in the 2011–12 season, before Missouri moved to the Southeastern Conference. For nearly a century beforehand, the two schools shared conferences, beginning in the 1913–14 season in the Missouri Valley Conference, then in the Big Eight Conference and its predecessors from 1928 to 1996, and finally the Big 12 Conference from 1996 to 2012.

Wichita State
Kansas State had an ongoing in-state, out-of-conference rivalry with Wichita State, dating back to 1932 and last played in 2022. Kansas State leads the series 22–11. The series had six games from 1932 to 1964, then six games on a home-and-home rotation from the 1969–70 to 1971–72 seasons, and most recently 19 home-and-home games every season from 1985–86 to 2003–04.

When Wichita State became a Top 25 regular in the early 2010s, there came interest in reviving the series. In February 2013, Kansas state senator Michael O'Donnell introduced a bill requiring Kansas and Kansas State to schedule Wichita State.

Postseason

NCAA tournament results
The Wildcats have appeared in the NCAA tournament 32 times. Their overall record in the NCAA Tournament is 37–35 through the 2023 tournament.

From 2011 to 2015 the round of 64 was known as the Second Round, round of 32 was Third Round

NCAA tournament seeding history
The NCAA began seeding the tournament with the 1979 edition.

NIT results
The Wildcats have appeared in the National Invitation Tournament (NIT) seven times. Their combined record is 6–8.

NCIT results
The Wildcats appeared in one of the only two ever National Commissioners Invitational Tournaments. Their record is 0–1.

Individual awards and accomplishments

Retired jerseys
The following players' jerseys have been retired by Kansas State, though their respective jersey numbers remain available for use. They represent the finest basketball players to come through Kansas State. The criteria for determining the honor includes statistical achievement, conference and national records, honors received (such as all-conference, All-American, Academic All-American), character and sportsmanship.

National honors 

The following Kansas State players and coaches are in the Naismith Memorial Basketball Hall of Fame (with induction year):
Bob Boozer (2010) (as member of 1960 United States men's Olympic basketball team)
Cotton Fitzsimmons (2021)
Jack Gardner (1984)
Mitch Richmond (2014)
Tex Winter (2011)
The following Kansas State players and coaches are in the National Collegiate Basketball Hall of Fame (with induction year):
Bob Boozer (2016)
Rolando Blackman (2015)
Jack Gardner (2006)
Tex Winter (2010)
Kansas State players and coaches have won the following national awards:

Player honors
 USBWA National Freshman of the YearBest freshman
Michael Beasley – 2008
 Frances Pomeroy Naismith AwardOutstanding undersized senior
Jacob Pullen – 2011
 Pete Newell Big Man AwardTop low-post player
Michael Beasley – 2008

Coaching honors
NABC Coach of the Year AwardCoach of the year
Jack Hartman – 1981
 UPI College Basketball Coach of the YearCoach of the year
Tex Winter – 1958

All-Americans
The following players were named first, second or third-team All-Americans by one of outlets used by the NCAA to determine consensus selections

Conference honors 
The Big Eight Conference established the Conference Player of the Year and Coach of the Year awards in 1957. These awards have continued into the Big 12 Conference era.

 Player of the Year
Bob Boozer – 1958, 1959
Lon Kruger – 1973, 1974
Mike Evans – 1977, 1978
Rolando Blackman – 1980
Michael Beasley – 2008

 Coach of the Year
Tex Winter – 1958, 1959, 1960
Cotton Fitzsimmons – 1970
Jack Hartman – 1975, 1977
Dana Altman – 1993
Frank Martin – 2010
Bruce Weber − 2013
Jerome Tang − 2023

Wildcats to pros
The following former Wildcats have gone on to play professionally, either in the NBA or elsewhere. Kansas State University has had two overall #1 draft picks in the NBA since the draft began in 1947: Howie Shannon (1949) and Bob Boozer (1959). 

 Tyrone Adams
 Curtis Allen
 Ron Anderson
 Freddy Asprilla
 Ernie Barrett
 Danny Beard
 Michael Beasley
 Rolando Blackman
 Brandon Bolden
 Bob Boozer
 Barry Brown Jr.
 Jack Carby
 Norris Coleman
 Luis Colon
 Denis Clemente
 Larry Comley
 Les Craft
 Cartier Diarra
 Adrian Diaz
 Roy DeWitz
 Justin Edwards
 Corlbe Ervin
 Mike Evans
 Marcus Foster
 Wally Frank

 Carl R. Gerlach
 Thomas Gipson
 David Hall
 Rick Harman
 Ed Head
 Jordan Henriquez
 Steve Henson
 Lew Hitch
 Steve Honeycutt
 Stephen Hurt
 Martavious Irving
 Jim Iverson
 Wes Iwundu
 D.J. Johnson
 Mike Johnson
 Nigel Johnson
 Askia Jones
 Wally Judge
 Jerry Jung
 Curtis Kelly
 Darren Kent
 Dick Knostman
 Lon Kruger
 Ernie Kusnyer
 Don Matuszak

 Cartier Martin
 Jeremiah Massey
 Don Matuzsak
 Makol Mawien
 Mike McGuirl
 Rodney McGruder
 Pat McKenzie
 Steve Mitchell
 Willie Murrell
 Juevol Myles
 Ed Nealy
 Michael Orris
 Jack Parr
 Pervis Pasco
 Fred Peete
 Nick Pino
 Cedrick Price
 Jesse Prisock
 Jacob Pullen
 Randy Reed
 Mitch Richmond
 Ángel Rodríguez
 Bob Rousey
 Nick Russell
 Jamar Samuels

 Matt Siebrandt
 Earl Seyfert
 Howie Shannon
 David Sloan
 Mark Smith
 Roy Smith
 Xavier Sneed
 Shane Southwell
 Jack Stone
 Kamau Stokes
 Dominique Sutton
 Roger Suttner
 Austin Trice
 Jerry Venable
 Dean Wade
 Bill Walker
 Jeff Webb
 Chuckie Williams
 Gene Williams
 Larry Williams
 Nino Williams
 Jari Wills
 Akeem Wright
 Mike Wroblewski
 Deilvez Yearby

Draft history

Former players as coaches
A number of former Wildcat players have gone to successful careers as head basketball coaches, including:

Bob Chipman – finished career as 21st-winningest coach in college basketball history
Mike Evans
Bill Guthridge – National college coach of the year (1998)
Steve Henson
Tim Jankovich
Gene Keady – 4x national college coach of the year; National Collegiate Basketball Hall of Fame
Lon Kruger – Coached five Division I schools to the NCAA tournament
Jim Molinari
Brad Underwood

Coaches

Kansas State has had 23 head coaches. A number of notable and successful coaches have led the Wildcats through the years.  Following are all the coaches that have been at Kansas State.

Conference membership history
?–1912: Kansas Intercollegiate Athletic Association
1913–1927: Missouri Valley Intercollegiate Athletic Association
1928–1947: Big 6 Conference
1948–1957: Big 7 Conference
1958–1995: Big 8 Conference
1996–Present: Big 12 Conference

Series records

Record vs. Big 12 opponents

Record vs. former Big 12 opponents

See also
 List of teams with the most victories in NCAA Division I men's college basketball
 NCAA Division I Men's Final Four appearances by school

References

External links
 

 
Basketball teams established in 1902